The 2012 ICC Awards were held on 15 September 2012 in Colombo, Sri Lanka. The ICC had been hosting ICC Awards since 2004, which were now into their ninth year. Previous events were held in London (2004, 2011), Sydney (2005), Mumbai (2006), Johannesburg (2007, 2009), Dubai (2008) and Bangalore (2010). The ICC awards the Sir Garfield Sobers Trophy to the Cricketer of the Year, which is considered to be the most prestigious award in world cricket.

Selection Committee
Chaired by ICC Cricket Hall of Famer Clive Lloyd, the ICC Selection Committee was charged with two main tasks. Using their experience, knowledge and appreciation of the game, they selected the ICC World XI Teams and provided a long list of nominations to the 32 members of the voting academy to cast their votes in the individual player award categories.

Selection Committee members:

 Clive Lloyd (chairman)
 Marvan Atapattu
 Tom Moody
 Carl Hooper
 Clare Connor

Award categories and winners

Cricketer of the Year

 Kumar Sangakkara

Test Player of the Year

 Kumar Sangakkara

ODI Player of the Year

 Virat Kohli

Twenty20 International Performance of the Year
 Richard Levi, for scoring 117 not out off 51 deliveries against New Zealand at Seddon Park in Hamilton on 19 February 2012

Emerging Player of the Year

 Sunil Narine

Associate Player of the Year
 George Dockrell

Umpire of the Year

 Kumar Dharmasena

Women's ODI Cricketer of the Year
 Stafanie Taylor

Women's T20I Cricketer of the Year
 Sarah Taylor

Spirit of Cricket
 Daniel Vettori, for refraining from appealing during the only Test match against Zimbabwe at Queens Sports Club in Bulawayo on 5 November 2011

LG People's Choice Award
 Kumar Sangakkara

ICC World XI Teams

ICC Test Team of the Year

Michael Clarke was selected as the captain of the Test Team of the Year, with Matt Prior selected as the wicket-keeper. Other players are:

 Alastair Cook
 Hashim Amla
 Kumar Sangakkara
 Jacques Kallis
 Michael Clarke
 Shivnarine Chanderpaul
 Matt Prior
 Stuart Broad
 Saeed Ajmal
 Vernon Philander
 Dale Steyn
 AB de Villiers (12th man)

ICC ODI Team of the Year
For the third time in his career, MS Dhoni was selected as both captain and wicket-keeper of the ODI Team of the Year. Other players are:

 Gautam Gambhir
 Alastair Cook
 Kumar Sangakkara
 Virat Kohli
 MS Dhoni
 Michael Clarke
 Shahid Afridi
 Morné Morkel
 Steven Finn
 Lasith Malinga
 Saeed Ajmal
 Shane Watson (12th man)

Short lists
The short lists for the 2012 LG ICC Awards were announced by the ICC on 30 August 2012. They are the following:

Cricketer of the Year
 Hashim Amla
 Michael Clarke
 Vernon Philander
 Kumar Sangakkara

Test Player of the Year
 Hashim Amla
 Michael Clarke
 Vernon Philander
 Kumar Sangakkara

ODI Player of the Year
 MS Dhoni
 Virat Kohli
 Lasith Malinga
 Kumar Sangakkara

Twenty20 International Performance of the Year
 Tillakaratne Dilshan
 Chris Gayle
 Richard Levi
 Ajantha Mendis

Emerging Player of the Year
 Doug Bracewell
 Dinesh Chandimal
 Sunil Narine
 James Pattinson

Associate Player of the Year
 Kevin O'Brien
 George Dockrell
 Ed Joyce
 Paul Stirling
 Dawlat Zadran

Umpire of the Year
 Billy Bowden
 Aleem Dar
 Kumar Dharmasena
 Richard Kettleborough
 Simon Taufel
 Rod Tucker

Women's ODI Cricketer of the Year
 Lydia Greenway
 Anisa Mohammed
 Sarah Taylor
 Stafanie Taylor

Women's T20I Cricketer of the Year
 Alyssa Healy
 Lisa Sthalekar
 Sarah Taylor
 Stafanie Taylor

Spirit of Cricket
 Mohammad Hafeez
 Jacques Kallis
 Daniel Vettori
 AB de Villiers

LG People's Choice Award
 James Anderson
 Jacques Kallis
 Vernon Philander
 Kumar Sangakkara
 Sachin Tendulkar

Nominations
The following are the nominations for the 2012 LG ICC Awards:

Cricketer of the Year
 Saeed Ajmal
 Hashim Amla
 Stuart Broad
 Michael Clarke
 Alastair Cook
 Virat Kohli
 Vernon Philander
 Kumar Sangakkara
 Stafanie Taylor

Test Player of the Year
 Saeed Ajmal
 Hashim Amla
 Stuart Broad
 Shivnarine Chanderpaul
 Michael Clarke
 Alastair Cook
 Jacques Kallis
 Vernon Philander
 Matt Prior
 Marlon Samuels
 Kumar Sangakkara
 Dale Steyn
 AB de Villiers

ODI Player of the Year
 Shahid Afridi
 Saeed Ajmal
 Michael Clarke
 Alastair Cook
 MS Dhoni
 Steven Finn
 Gautam Gambhir
 Shakib Al Hasan
 Virat Kohli
 Lasith Malinga
 Brendon McCullum
 Morné Morkel
 Sunil Narine
 Kumar Sangakkara
 Brendan Taylor
 Shane Watson

Twenty20 International Performance of the Year
 Ravi Bopara
 Tillakaratne Dilshan
 Chris Gayle
 Martin Guptill
 Mohammad Hafeez
 Alex Hales
 Richard Levi
 Brendon McCullum
 Ajantha Mendis
 Sunil Narine
 Elias Sunny

Emerging Player of the Year
 Trent Boult
 Doug Bracewell
 Dinesh Chandimal
 Pat Cummins
 Nasir Hossain
 Junaid Khan
 Nathan Lyon
 Tino Mawoyo
 Sunil Narine
 James Pattinson
 Lahiru Thirimanne
 Matthew Wade

Associate Player of the Year
 Shaiman Anwar
 Peter Borren
 Kevin O'Brien
 George Dockrell
 Trent Johnston
 Ed Joyce
 John Mooney
 Hiral Patel
 Paul Stirling
 Dawlat Zadran

Umpire of the Year
 Billy Bowden
 Aleem Dar
 Steve Davis
 Kumar Dharmasena
 Billy Doctrove
 Marais Erasmus
 Ian Gould
 Tony Hill
 Richard Kettleborough
 Nigel Llong
 Asad Rauf
 Simon Taufel
 Rod Tucker

Women's ODI Cricketer of the Year
 Jess Duffin
 Shanel Daley
 Lydia Greenway
 Anisa Mohammed
 Mithali Raj
 Sarah Taylor
 Stafanie Taylor

Women's T20I Cricketer of the Year
 Jess Duffin
 Shanel Daley
 Alyssa Healy
 Anisa Mohammed
 Mithali Raj
 Lisa Sthalekar
 Sarah Taylor
 Stafanie Taylor

Spirit of Cricket
 Mohammad Hafeez
 Jacques Kallis
 Kieron Pollard
 Daniel Vettori
 AB de Villiers

See also

 International Cricket Council
 ICC Awards
 Sir Garfield Sobers Trophy (Cricketer of the Year)
 ICC Test Player of the Year
 ICC ODI Player of the Year
 David Shepherd Trophy (Umpire of the Year)
 ICC Women's Cricketer of the Year
 ICC Test Team of the Year
 ICC ODI Team of the Year

References

External links
 ICC Awards Colombo 2012

International Cricket Council awards and rankings
Crick
2012 in cricket